José Jaspe (10 August 1906 – 5 June 1974) was a Spanish film actor.

He played Konev the conductor in Horror Express (1972), Ahmed in House of 1,000 Dolls (1967), Henneker in The Man Called Noon (1973), the traitor in The Centurion (1961), Sabrath in The Golden Arrow (1962), Spanish POW in Submarine Attack (1954), José in Black Jack (1950), and Enrique in El pobre rico (1942), by Ignacio F. Iquino. He appeared in the Spaghetti Western film Jesse James' Kid (1965), starring Mercedes Alonso, Roberto Camardiel and Luis Induni.

He died in Becerril de la Sierra in 1974.

Selected filmography

 El sobre lacrado (1941)
 We Thieves Are Honourable (1942) - Pelirrojo
 El pobre rico (1942)
 La culpa del otro (1942) - Patrón
 Boda accidentada (1943) - Mario
 Un enredo de familia (1943) - Niceto
 El abanderado (1943) - Malasaña
 Mi fantástica esposa (1944)
 Paraíso sin Eva (1944)
 El sobrino de don Buffalo Bill (1944)
 El rey de las finanzas (1944) - Canadiense
 The Phantom and Dona Juanita (1945) - Amaru
 Thirsty Land (1945)
 Su última noche (1945) - Jerry
 Gentleman Thief (1946) - Star
 The Prodigal Woman (1946) - Conde de Zuera
 El pirata Bocanegra (1946) - Capitán Sosa
 El otro Fu-Man-Chú (1946)
 María Fernanda, la Jerezana (1947) - Ricardo Prado Rey
 Las inquietudes de Shanti Andía (1947) - Chim
 Héroes del 95 (1947)
 Reina santa (1947) - Estevao (uncredited)
 Dulcinea (1947) - Chiquirnaque
 The Captain's Ship (1947)
 Lady in Ermine (1947) - Andrés
 The Princess of the Ursines (1947) - Truhán
 Four Women (1947) - Dueño del café
 Luis Candelas, el ladrón de Madrid (1947) - Mariano Balseiro
 La próxima vez que vivamos (1948)
 Las aguas bajan negras (1948) - Plutón, mining foreman
 Póker de ases (1948) - Pardo Leiva
 A Toast for Manolete (1948) - Bronquista en bar
 Pototo, Boliche y Compañía (1948)
 La manigua sin dios (1949)
 ¡Fuego! (1949)
 The Duchess of Benameji (1949) - Bandolero #3
 Paz (1949) - Oficial de las fuerzas del este
 El sótano (1949) - Borracho
 Ninety Minutes (1950) - Sr. Dupont
 Agustina of Aragon (1950)
 Black Jack (1950) - José
 The Lioness of Castille (1951) - Juan Bravo
 Dawn of America (1951) - Marinero
 The Call of Africa (1952) - Majayu
 Frine, Courtesan of Orient (1953) - Crosio, mercante di schiave
 Mamma perdonami! (1953) - Enrico
 Musoduro (1953) - Carabinieri
 Carmen (1953) - Tuerto
 Condannatelo! (1953) - Ferdinando
 Ultima illusione (1954) - Produttore cinema
 Submarine Attack (1955) - Spanish POW
 Folgore Division (1955) - Mario Salvi
 I quattro del getto tonante (1955) - Maresciallo Alberti
 Operazione notte (1957)
 Saranno uomini (1957)
 El Alamein (1957) - (uncredited)
 Classe di ferro (1957) - Filadelfio
 The Italians They Are Crazy (1958)
 Legs of Gold (1958) - assistente di Renzoli
 La sfida (1958) - Ferdinando Ajello
 Conspiracy of the Borgias (1959) - Falconetto
 Il cavaliere senza terra (1959)
 Poveri milionari (1959) - Store Manager
 Devil's Cavaliers (1959) - Jermaine, Stiller Henchman
 Noi siamo due evasi (1959) - Jacinto
 The Night of the Great Attack (1959) - Il Tacca
 Nel blu dipinto di blu (1959) - Maresciallo dei Carabinieri
 The Dam on the Yellow River (1960) - Slansky
 Queen of the Pirates (1960) - Captain Mirko, Duke's Ally
 Le bal des espions (1960)
 Mobby Jackson (1960)
 Spade senza bandiera (1961) - Priest
 Capitani di ventura (1961)
 The Centurion (1961) - Traitor
 Rage of the Buccaneers (1961) - Captain Tortuga
 Scano Boa (1961)
 The Golden Arrow (1962) - Sabrath
 The Sign of the Coyote (1963) - Lugones Brother
 Slave Girls of Sheba (1963) - Pirate
 The Black Tulip (1964) - Brignon
 Devil of the Desert Against the Son of Hercules (1964) - Akrim, the Slave Merchant
 Backfire (1964) - Libanos (uncredited)
 Cyrano and d'Artagnan (1964) - (uncredited)
 Texas Ranger (1964) - Mortimer
 Saul e David (1964) - (uncredited)
 Jesse James' Kid (1965)
 The Dictator's Guns (1965)
 I grandi condottieri (1965) - Zebaj / Zebah
 The Relentless Four (1965) - Implacable
 Doctor Zhivago (1965) - Man who fires the shot that starts the revolution (uncredited)
 Rojo (1966) - José Garibaldi
 Four Queens for an Ace (1966) - Enrique Manega
 Savage Pampas (1966) - Pvt. Luis
 Cervantes (1967) - Turkish Official
 The House of 1,000 Dolls (1967) - Ahmed
 Killer Adios (1968) - Bob Elliott
 Dos hombres van a morir (1968) - Zachary Hutchinson
 A Stranger in Paso Bravo (1968) - Paquito
 Un colpo da mille miliardi (1968)
 Day After Tomorrow (1968) - Pablo
 Pistol for a Hundred Coffins (1968) - David, Madman (uncredited)
 White Comanche (1968) - (uncredited)
 Krakatoa: East of Java (1968)
 Tiempos de Chicago (1969) - Truck Driver
 Taste of Vengeance (1969) - Phil, 'Filthy Bottom'
 Playgirl 70 (1969)
 La última aventura del Zorro (1969) - El Gobernador
 More Dollars for the MacGregors (1970) - Sheriff of Jonesville
 Light the Fuse... Sartana Is Coming (1970) - Gen. Monk
 Growing Leg, Diminishing Skirt (1970)
 Red Sun (1971) - Locomotive Driver (uncredited)
 Boulevard do Rum (1971)
 Long Live Your Death (1971) - The old man
 I senza Dio (1972) - Curpancho
 Horror Express (1972) - Konev - Conductor
 Treasure Island (1972) - Tommy
 Marianela (1972) - Sr. Centeno
 La isla misteriosa y el capitán Nemo (1973)
 The Man Called Noon (1973) - Henneker
 The Three Musketeers of the West (1973) - Whistling Man (uncredited)
 Pasqualino Cammarata, Frigate Captain (1974)
 La loba y la Paloma (1974) - Acebo
 La noche de la furia (1974) - Sheriff

 References 

 Bibliography 
 
 Peter Cowie & Derek Elley. World Filmography: 1967''. Fairleigh Dickinson University Press, 1977.

External links 

 

1906 births
1974 deaths
Spanish male film actors
People from A Coruña